Cristián Ignacio Dettoni Jorquera (born 8 October 1974) is a Chilean para table tennis player who competes in international table tennis competitions. He is a Parapan American Games and Pan American champion, he has also competed at the Paralympic Games three times.

References

1974 births
Living people
Sportspeople from Santiago
Paralympic table tennis players of Chile
Chilean male table tennis players
Table tennis players at the 2012 Summer Paralympics
Table tennis players at the 2016 Summer Paralympics
Table tennis players at the 2020 Summer Paralympics
Medalists at the 2003 Parapan American Games
Medalists at the 2011 Parapan American Games
Medalists at the 2015 Parapan American Games
Medalists at the 2019 Parapan American Games
21st-century Chilean people